Waylon Muller (born 15 May 1972) is a Marshall Islands wrestler. He was the flag-bearer for the Marshall Islands during the opening ceremony of the 2008 Beijing Olympic Games.

References

Living people
Marshallese male sport wrestlers
1972 births